"Never" is a song written by Dean Pitchford and Michael Gore and recorded by Australian pop rock band Moving Pictures. It was featured on the chart-topping soundtrack album of the 1984 motion picture Footloose. The song is best known for a scene in the film when an angst-ridden Ren McCormack (Kevin Bacon) punchdances around an abandoned warehouse.

The song was also included in the soundtrack of the 2007 film Hot Rod, which parodies the punchdance scene with Rod Kimble (Andy Samberg) in a forest. More recently, on April 27, 2014, the song was used in "Baby Got Black", the eighteenth episode of season 12 of Family Guy, with Peter Griffin parodying the Footloose punchdance scene.

Despite the popularity of the song, Moving Pictures were never paid royalties from its use. According to lead vocalist Alex Smith, “We were just the lowest part of the food chain. Gobbled up by companies and people that suddenly stopped existing, when we asked where our money was. The things you get talked into doing! Anyway we got to record at Sound City and The Record Plant but a couple of bucks would have been nice. Hence, we 'Never' play the song.” Guitarist Garry Frost also commented: "We performed it, it was written by the guys that made the movie, and we got nothing from it. Someone made a lot of money out of that song, and it wasn’t us."

Track listing

Personnel
 Alex Smith – lead vocals
 Garry Frost – guitar
 Charlie Cole – keyboards
 Alan Pasqua - synthesizer
 Ian Lees – bass
 Andrew Thompson – saxophone
 Mark Meyer – drums
 Paulinho da Costa – percussion
 Marcy Levy, Richard Page, Carmen Grillo, Tom Kelly, Steve George – backing vocals

MIE version

A Japanese-language version of "Never" was written by Gorō Matsui and recorded by singer MIE, best known as one-half of the J-pop duo Pink Lady. The single became the most successful in her solo career, peaking at number four in Oricon's singles charts and selling 274,000 copies. "Never" was also used as the theme song for the TBS drama series .

"Otsudane", the single's B-side, was used for commercials promoting Satsuma Shuzo's Mild Shiranami Otsudane sake.

Track listing

Chart positions

Other cover versions
Minako Honda covered the song on her 1986 live video/album The Virgin Live in Budokan.
Demon Kakka covered the song on his 2008 cover album Girls Rock: Hakurai. His cover incorporates both the English and Japanese lyrics of the song.

References

External links
  (Moving Pictures)
  (MIE)

1984 songs
1984 singles
Moving Pictures (band) songs
Songs with music by Michael Gore
Songs written by Dean Pitchford
Songs from Footloose
Columbia Records singles
EMI Records singles
Japanese-language songs
Japanese television drama theme songs
Songs with lyrics by Gorō Matsui
Sony Music Entertainment Japan singles